Mahakal Superfast Express  is a Humsafar Express train of the Indian Railways connecting Varanasi Junction in Uttar Pradesh and Indore Junction in Madhya Pradesh via Lucknow. It is currently being operated with 20413/20414 (via Lucknow) twice a week and 20415/20416 (via Prayagraj) once a week. This train share rake with Mahakal Superfast Express (Via Prayagraj). This is the 1st private Humsafar Express train and 3rd private train owned by Indian Railway Catering and Tourism Corporation (IRCTC), but now it is currently operated by Indian Railways.

Coach composition 
The train has  3-tier AC and sleeper coach trains designed by Indian Railways it has 3 sleeper coach and more than 7 third ac coach and 1 second ac one pantry car also.

Service 
It averages 60 km/hr as 20413 Humsafar Express covering 1110 km in 18 hrs 45 mins & 59 km/hr as 20414 Humsafar Express covering 1110 km in 18 hrs 20 mins.

Schedule

Locomotive

This train is hauled by a Ghaziabad (GZB) / Vadodara (BRC) loco shed based WAP 7 locomotive on its entire journey.

Stoppage 

 Varanasi Junction
 Sultanpur Junction
 Lucknow Charbagh
 Kanpur Central
 Jhansi Junction
 Bina Junction
 Sant Hirdaram Nagar
 Ujjain Junction
 Indore Junction

See also 

 Humsafar Express
 Varanasi Junction
 Indore Junction
 IRCTC Kashi Mahakal Humsafar Express (Via Allahabad)

References 

 https://indiarailinfo.com/train/irctc-kashi-mahakal-humsafar-express-via-lucknow-82401/111962/334/8
 https://indiarailinfo.com/train/irctc-kashi-mahakal-humsafar-express-via-lucknow-82402/112006/8/334

Humsafar Express trains
Transport in Indore
Passenger trains originating from Varanasi
Transport in Ujjain
Rail transport in Madhya Pradesh
Railway services introduced in 2020